"Down Hearted Blues" is a blues song composed by musician Lovie Austin, with lyrics by American jazz singer Alberta Hunter. The first line sets the theme for the song: "Gee but it's hard to love someone when that someone don't love you."  Hunter sang it during her engagement at the Dreamland Cafe, in Chicago, where she performed with Joe "King" Oliver's band.

Blues singer Bessie Smith recorded the song with piano accompaniment by Clarence Williams.  It was released as her first single (backed with "Gulf Coast Blues") and 780,000 copies were sold in the first six months.

The National Recording Preservation Board included Smith's recording in the inaugural National Recording Registry of the Library of Congress in 2002. The board recognizes songs that are "culturally, historically, or aesthetically significant." In 2001, the Recording Industry Association of America, with the National Endowment for the Arts, included it at number 315 in the list of the Top 365 "Songs of the Century". The Rock and Roll Hall of Fame identified it as one of the "500 Songs That Shaped Rock". In 2006, Smith's recording received a Grammy Hall of Fame Award.

Notes

External links
Partial list of versions at Secondhandsongs.com

1923 singles
1922 songs
Blues songs
Bessie Smith songs
Grammy Hall of Fame Award recipients
United States National Recording Registry recordings